Duttenhofer is a surname. Notable people with the surname include:

Christian Duttenhofer (1778–1846), German engraver
Luise Duttenhofer (1776–1829), German papercutting artist
Max Duttenhofer (1843–1903), German entrepreneur and industrialist

German-language surnames